Liangcheng County (Mongolian:   Лиыанчан сиыан Liyaŋčaŋ siyan) is a county of south-central Inner Mongolia, People's Republic of China, bounded by Shanxi province to the south. It is under the administration of Ulaan Chab city, and borders Fengzhen City to the east, Zhuozi County to the north, and the regional capital of Hohhot to the west.

Climate

References

County-level divisions of Inner Mongolia
Ulanqab